Fiesta! Magsasaya Ang Lahat is the fourth studio album of the Filipino band, 6cyclemind. Having 18 tracks, it was released by Musiko Records & Sony BMG Music Entertainment (Philippines), Inc. in October 18, 2007.

Track listing

References

6cyclemind albums
2007 albums